Pihla Viitala  (born 30 September 1982) is a Finnish actress. She studied acting at the Helsinki Theatre Academy.

Personal life 
In 2004, Viitala married musician Kerkko Koskinen; the couple divorced in 2008. She married Kazakh-German Alex Schimpf in 2011, and the couple have one child together, daughter Astrid (b. 2012); the family lives in Helsinki.

Finnish actress Rebecca Viitala is her cousin.

Filmography

Awards 
 2010 Shooting Stars Award

References

External links 

 
 Interview on cineuropa.org (Video)
 Portrait at agencyunreal

1982 births
Living people
Actresses from Helsinki
Finnish film actresses
Finnish television actresses
21st-century Finnish actresses
21st-century Finnish women singers
Finnish film directors
Make-up artists
Costume designers